Bruno Cazarine Constantino, also known as Bruno Cazarine (born 6 May 1983 in Mogi das Cruzes, São Paulo), is a retired Brazilian footballer who played as a striker.

Career
Cazarine is a modern-day journeyman having played short stints for clubs in Brazil, Qatar, Portugal, Italy, Spain, China, South Korea and Australia.

Sydney FC
On 27 August 2010, Cazarine signed a 12-month deal with 2009–10 Australian A-League champions Sydney FC after a successful trial. He made his debut for Sydney in their Round 5, 3–1 loss to Adelaide United at the Sydney Football Stadium

Cazarine's first goal for Sydney FC was in a 2–1 away loss to Wellington Phoenix. After finishing the 2010/11 season as Sydney FC's highest goalscorer with 9 goals, Cazarine signed a 1-year extension allowing him to play in the Asian Champions League and into the 2011–12 season.

Cazarine played an important role along with Nick Carle in helping to keep Sydney FC's Champions League campaign hopes alive after scoring a brace in Sydney's 3–2 win against Shanghai Shenhua in Shanghai, followed by Sydney's only goal a week later in their 3–1 loss to Suwon Bluewings.

Cazarine made his milestone 50th and final appearance for the club in their 3–2 semi-final defeat at the hands of Wellington Phoenix. He left the club at the end of the 2011–12 season citing a mixture of uncertainty regarding his future at the club, as well as family reasons back in Brazil.

Sydney FC statistics
Cazarine is Sydney FC's second most prolific striker in the club's history, with a goals to game ratio of 0.34 goals/game. This sits him behind Alessandro Del Piero at 0.58 goals/game and in front of previous Sydney FC stars Dwight Yorke on 0.32 and Alex Brosque in third at 0.30. This also included many appearances as a substitute in the 2011–12 season.

Statistics accurate as of 1 April 2012

References

External links
 
 

1983 births
Living people
Brazilian footballers
Brazilian expatriate footballers
Expatriate footballers in Qatar
Expatriate footballers in China
Expatriate footballers in Spain
Expatriate footballers in Portugal
Expatriate footballers in Italy
Expatriate footballers in South Korea
Expatriate soccer players in Australia
Primeira Liga players
K League 1 players
A-League Men players
Al-Sailiya SC players
China League One players
Chengdu Tiancheng F.C. players
Gyeongnam FC players
Sydney FC players
Sociedade Esportiva Palmeiras players
Clube Atlético Bragantino players
Esporte Clube Bahia players
Guarani FC players
Vila Nova Futebol Clube players
Terrassa FC footballers
Associação Naval 1º de Maio players
A.S.D. Martina Calcio 1947 players
People from Mogi das Cruzes
Qatar Stars League players
Association football forwards
Footballers from São Paulo (state)